Eleutherodactylus gundlachi is a species of frog in the family Eleutherodactylidae. It is endemic to southeastern Cuba. The specific name gundlachi honors Johannes Christoph Gundlach, a German zoologist. Common names Turquino spiny frog and Gundlach's robber frog have been coined for it.

Description
The head is as wide as the body or narrower. Dorsal skin has many granules and tubercles. There is a conspicuous W-shaped suprascapular fold. The finger and toe discs are small. Coloration is dark brown or greenish brown, either relatively uniform or with irregular spots. Clear dorsolateral stripes
or two rounded spots on the middle of the back are present in some individuals.  The belly can be whitish, pinkish, or yellowish. The throat is white or with brown reticulation. The limbs have dark bands.

Habitat and conservation
It is a terrestrial species; males call from the ground. Development is direct, without free-living larval stage. It is a common species in suitable habitat, but its range is restricted. It is threatened by habitat loss caused by agriculture, woodcutting, disturbance from tourist activities, and infrastructure development. It occurs in a number of protected areas, but many of these are not well managed for conservation.

References

gundlachi
Endemic fauna of Cuba
Amphibians of Cuba
Amphibians described in 1920
Taxa named by Karl Patterson Schmidt
Taxonomy articles created by Polbot